Robert James Cockrell (4 April 1950 – 26 May 2000) was a South African rugby union player who played eleven test matches for the South Africa national rugby union team.

Playing career
Cockrell made his provincial debut for Western Province in 1972 and played in 102 matches for the union.

He made his test debut for the Springboks on 23 November 1974 at Stade Municipal in Toulouse against France. Cockrell scored his first and only test try during his third test match on 21 June 1975 in Bloemfontein against the touring French team captained by Richard Astre.

His last test match, was the Springboks’ first ever test match against the USA on 20 September 1981 at the Owl Creek Polo ground in Glenville, New York. Cockrell also played in 14 tour matches for the Springboks and scored one try.

Test history

See also
List of South Africa national rugby union players – Springbok no. 486

References

1950 births
2000 deaths
South African rugby union players
South Africa international rugby union players
Rugby union hookers
Western Province (rugby union) players
Rugby union players from Cape Town